Julian High School may refer to:

 Julian High School (Chicago), Chicago, Illinois
 Julian High School (California), Julian, California